Yoon Park (born November 18, 1987) is a South Korean actor.

Career
Yoon began his entertainment career as a drummer for the band Can't Play Well, which won the Bronze Prize at the 34th MBC Campus Song Festival in 2010. When his contract with agency S.M. Entertainment expired, he joined JYP Entertainment in 2013. Yoon had starring roles in the television dramas What Happens to My Family? (2014) and Flower of Queen (2015).

In June 2021, Yoon signed with new agency H& Entertainment.

Filmography

Film

Television series

Web series

Television show

Radio shows

Music video

Theater

Awards and nominations

References

External links 

1987 births
Living people
21st-century South Korean male actors
JYP Entertainment artists
South Korean male film actors
South Korean male stage actors
South Korean male television actors
Korea National University of Arts alumni